Conall mac Fidhghal, 25th King of Uí Maine, died 782.

Reign

Duncadho mac Duib Da Tuadh does not appear in the genealogies. His is the second of four or five short and highly obscure reigns.

This may indicate conflict, perhaps due to internal succession disputes or aggression from the expanding Uí Briúin under Artgal mac Cathail (died 791).

References

 Annals of Ulster at CELT: Corpus of Electronic Texts at University College Cork
 Annals of Tigernach at CELT: Corpus of Electronic Texts at University College Cork
Revised edition of McCarthy's synchronisms at Trinity College Dublin.
 Byrne, Francis John (2001), Irish Kings and High-Kings, Dublin: Four Courts Press,

External links
 Commentary by Dan M. Wiley (The Cycles of the Kings Web Project)

People from County Galway
People from County Roscommon
8th-century Irish monarchs
Kings of Uí Maine